Vivax, a Latin adjective meaning tenacious of life, long-lived, vivacious, venerable, may refer to:
 Vivax (company), one of Brazil's largest cable companies operating in Campinas
 Vivax (trademark), a Sony trademark

Other use 
 Phyllostachys vivax, a bamboo species also known as Chinese Timber Bamboo
 Plasmodium vivax, a malaria pathogen